Tasuta is a rural locality (a selo) in Botlikshky Selsoviet, Botlikhsky District, Republic of Dagestan, Russia. The population was 369 as of 2010. There are 4 streets.

Geography 
Tasuta is located 20 km north of Botlikh (the district's administrative centre) by road, on the right bank of the Chankovskaya River. Chanko is the nearest rural locality.

References 

Rural localities in Botlikhsky District